The 1936 Winter Olympics, officially known as the IV Olympic Winter Games and commonly known as Garmisch-Partenkirchen 1936, were a winter multi-sport event held from 6 to 16 February 1936 in the market town of Garmisch-Partenkirchen, Germany. The country also hosted the 1936 Summer Olympics, which were held in Berlin. It was the last year in which the Summer and Winter Games both took place in the same country (the cancelled 1940 Olympics would have been held in Japan, with Tokyo hosting the Summer Games and Sapporo hosting the Winter Games).

The 1936 Winter Games were organized on behalf of the German League of the Reich for Physical Exercise (DRL) by Karl Ritter von Halt, who had been named president of the committee for the organization of the Fourth Winter Olympics in Garmisch-Partenkirchen by Reichssportführer Hans von Tschammer und Osten.

Highlights 

 German skier Willy Bogner took the Olympic oath during the opening ceremonies.
 Alpine skiing made its first appearance in the winter Olympics as the combined, which added a skier's results in both the downhill and slalom. German athletes Franz Pfnür won men's alpine and Christl Cranz won women's alpine events.
 Ivar Ballangrud won three out of the four speed skating races.
 Sonja Henie won her third consecutive gold medal in woman's figure skating.
 Switzerland won the 4 man bobsled in a time of 5:19.85.
 Great Britain upset 1932 gold medalists Canada in ice hockey when Edgar Brenchley scored the winning goal within the last ninety seconds.
 Norway won the overall games with a total of 7 gold medals, 5 silver medals and 3 bronze medals.

Sports 
Medals were awarded in 17 events contested in 4 sports (8 disciplines).

Skating

Skiing

Demonstration sports
 Military patrol
 Ice stock sport

Venues

Große Olympiaschanze – Cross-country skiing, Nordic combined, Opening and Closing Ceremonies, and Ski Jumping.
Gudiberg – Alpine skiing (combined – slalom)
Kreuzjoch – Alpine skiing (combined – downhill)
Kreuzeck – Alpine skiing (downhill finish line)
Olympia-Kunsteisstadion – Figure skating and Ice hockey
Riessersee and surrounding areas – Bobsleigh, Ice hockey, and Speed skating

Participating nations
28 nations sent athletes to compete in Germany.  Australia, Bulgaria, Greece, Liechtenstein, Spain, and Turkey all made their Winter Olympic debut in Garmisch-Partenkirchen, and Estonia, Latvia, Luxembourg, the Netherlands, and Yugoslavia all returned to the Games after having missed the 1932 Winter Olympics.

Number of athletes by National Olympic Committees (from highest to lowest)
<noinclude>

Medal count

Podium sweeps

See also 

National Socialist League of the Reich for Physical Exercise

References
Notes

Citations

External links 

 
 Complete official IOC report. In German
 The program of the 1936 Garmisch-Partenkirchen Winter Olympics

Further reading
Berlin Games – How Hitler Stole the Olympic Dream, by Guy Walters;  (UK),  (US)

 
Olympic Games in Germany
Winter Olympics by year
1936 in German sport
1936 in multi-sport events
Sport in Garmisch-Partenkirchen
February 1936 sports events
Winter multi-sport events in Germany
1930s in Bavaria
Sports competitions in Bavaria